California Proposition 6 may refer to:
 California Proposition 6 (2018) - REJECTED November 2018 Repeal of the Road Repair and Accountability Act
 California Proposition 6 (2008) - REJECTED Safe Neighborhoods Act and The Runner Initiative.
 California Proposition 6 (1998) - PASSED Felony to kill a horse, donkey or mule for human consumption.
 Briggs Initiative Prop 6 (1978) - REJECTED Proposed ban of gays and lesbians from working in California public schools.